The following is a list of notable events and releases that happened in 2005 in music in South Korea.

Debuting and disbanded in 2005

Debuting groups

 B. August
 Baechigi
 CSJH The Grace
 Gavy NJ
Lady
 Lovely Pretty Girls
Monni
 Nemesis
 Norazo
 Paran
 SS501
 Super Junior '05

Reformed groups
Sobangcha

Solo debuts

Eru
Ivy
Jang Woo-hyuk
J'Kyun
Jessi
Kim Woo-joo
Lee Jaewon
Lim Jeong-hee
Lee Ji-hye
Nam Hyun-joon
Naul
Paloalto
The Quiett
Seo Ji-young
Shim Eun-jin
Shin Hye-sung
Tablo

Disbanded groups
Cleo
Clon
Diva
UN

Releases in 2005

First quarter

January

February

March

April

May

June

July

August

September

October

November

December

See also
2005 in South Korea
List of South Korean films of 2005

References

 
South Korean music
K-pop